The Conotton Creek Trail is a rail trail in Ohio, running from Bowerston to Jewett in northern Harrison County. The trail spains 11.2 miles one way or 22.4 miles round trip. 

The paved multi-use trail is suitable for biking, unicycling, roller-blading, wheel chairing, jogging, and walking. It features six bridges, two of which (in Scio and Jewett) are covered. The trail has 40 birdhouses to attract tree swallows and bluebirds. The Rails-to-Trails Conservancy chose it as its "Trail of the Month" for March 2002.

The trail is owned by Harrison County, and is managed by a committee of trail advocates

The trail is a part of the Great American Rail-Trail.

External links
 Crossroads RC&D page on Conotton Creek Trail
 Trailink
 Ohio Bikeways
 Rail to Trails Trail of the Month

Bike paths in Ohio
Rail trails in Ohio
Protected areas of Harrison County, Ohio
Transportation in Harrison County, Ohio